Parted Magic is a commercial Linux distribution based on Slackware that comes with disk partitioning and data recovery tools. It is sold as a Linux-based bootable disk. The distribution's nomenclature is derived from the names of the GNU Parted and PartitionMagic software packages.

Features
The program is directly bootable from a CD, USB flash drive, or through a network using PXE on PC hardware, and does not require installation, or the presence of an installed operating system.

Although originally designed for mechanical hard disk drives, Parted Magic is suitable for use also with solid state drives and can perform an ATA Secure Erase (a method that is built into the hard drive controller to return the drive into its factory state).

Parted Magic supports reading and writing to a variety of modern file systems, including ext3, ext4, FAT, exFAT, and NTFS, and as such is able to access disk drives formatted for use under Microsoft Windows and Linux systems.

The software distribution includes networking support, and comes with the Firefox web browser.

System requirements
As of version 11.11.11, Parted Magic supports x86-64 processors natively (Intel x86 processors were previously supported), and requires a computer with at least a 64-bit Intel-compatible processor and 2GB of RAM. Secure boot is also supported. x86 versions from 2013_09_26 do not require the Physical Address Extension (PAE) computer processor feature.

All versions starting from 2020_08_23 no longer support 32-bit x86 systems.

Availability
Up to version 2013.08.01 the distribution was freely available for download from the official website and the project page on SourceForge. The distribution moved to a pay-for-download business model, despite the packaged software being free and open source.

See also
 SystemRescue – completely libre and free-to-download Live CD/USB system rescue disc
 gparted – partition editor included with Parted Magic
 Disk partitioning
 List of disk partitioning software

References

External links 

Parted Magic at the Internet Archive

Proprietary operating systems
X86-64 Linux distributions
Operating system distributions bootable from read-only media
Data erasure software
Data recovery software
Linux distributions without systemd
Linux distributions